Naserabad (also Romanized as Nāşerābād) is a village in Deris Rural District, in the Central District of Kazerun County, Fars Province, Iran. At the 2016 census, its population was 339, in 96 families.

References 

Populated places in Kazerun County